Rafael Mikhailovich Minasbekyan (born 2 February 1968) is a producer, screenwriter, executive manager of organizations. CEO of GK GPM KIT (Gazprom Media Group. Film. Internet. Television) – a part of the largest media holding of Russia and Eastern Europe – "Gazprom Media".

Biography 

Rafael Minasbekyan was born on 2 February 1968, in Yerevan. He is married with two children, a son and a daughter. In 1984 he graduated from Kamo highschool, № 76. In 1992, hegraduated from Yerevan State Medical Institute (YerMI) specializing in general medicine.

In 1995, he completed with distinction his medical residency in Psychotherapy. In 2006, he graduated from the Moscow Academy of labour market and information technology (MARTIT) specializing in "Management of organizations and anti-crisis management".

He went on to pursue his graduate studies and in 2006 obtained a PhD in Economics for his dissertation on "Development of intellectual capital of an enterprise using information technology to create high-tech products".

In 1990, with a group of friends he created a KVN team, "ErMI". In 1992 and 1994, the team, where he was a captain, won the championship of the KVN Major League. In 1995 he was the captain of "CIS United" and one of the captains in "World United" KVN teams.

In 1991, he began his career of a producer, screenwriter and director on television. 1993–1994 – Managing partner and Member of the Executive Board of the Cultural Commercial Company "Sharm" (Yerevan). 1994–1997 – Managing Partner and President of production studio Amber (Moscow) 1997 – 2002 – Managing Partner and President of the «Gorod» TV project studio (Moscow).

From September 2015 г. – the CEO of GK GPM KIT.

Creative career 

He is an author, producer and a screenplay writer of more than 300 feature films, documentaries, animated films, marketing programs, musical albums, top rated series and TV shows.

General producer of more than 30 feature films:
 «Generation P»
 «Furious. The legend of Kolovrat»
 «Frontier»
 «Rusalka. Ozero Mertvykh»
 «Text»
 «Son of a Rich»
 «Chernobyl: Abyss»
 «Doctor Lisa»
 «Silver Skates»
 «Ogon»
 «Row19»
 «Streltsov»
 «Robo» 
 «Baba Yaga: Terror of the Dark Forest» and others

General producer of over a 100 series:
 «Okhota na diavola»
 «Consultant»
 «Shelest»
 «Neulovimye»
 «The Fortress in Badaber»
 «Epidemia»
 «Rostov»
 «Otchim»
 «V kletke»
 «Ricochet»
 «Ded Morozov»
 «Sobor»
 «Chinovnica» and others.

Author and Executive producer of TV shows:

 «Starye pesni o glavnom 3»
 «Muzhchiny»
 «Novyi god na NTV»
 «Delo»
 «Moy XX vek»
 «Novyi god na TV-6» and others

Awards 

 In 2011, he received “Russian Media Manager” national prize, the main award in media business, for "Contribution to the industry's development, advanced business approaches and delivering unique marketing ideas".
 2017 – APKIT award, for the "Outlaw" TV-film created for the NTV Channel, "Best TV film 2017" category
 2018 – APKIT award for "Badaber Fortress" film created for the First TV Channel, "Best TV Film in 2018" category
 2019 – APKIT award "Best feature film" for the "Text”
 APKIT award for the "Battalion" series created for NTV, for the "Best TV film of 2019"
 2019 – Golden Eagle prize "Best film 2019" for the film "Text"
 Finisterra Arrábida international film festival award in the category Best Advertising Movies ("Best advertising film") for GPM KIT GROUP promo video. The author and producer of the film – Rafael Minasbekyan
 Award of the international animation festival DRAWTASTIC (USA) in the category "Best advertising". The Grand Prix of the festival – "Golden Pencil Award" – was given to the animated screensaver of the "KIT Studio". The video was directed by an Oscar–winning animator Alexander Petrov, and the author of the idea and producer – Rafael Minasbekyan.

References

External links 
 Rafael Mikhailovich Minasbekyan – Biography
 
 Kinopoisk.ru

1968 births
Living people
Television people from Yerevan
Armenian television producers
Armenian screenwriters
Armenian entertainment industry businesspeople